The lateral meniscus (external semilunar fibrocartilage) is a fibrocartilaginous band that spans the lateral side of the interior of the knee joint. It is one of two menisci of the knee, the other being the medial meniscus. It is nearly circular and covers a larger portion of the articular surface than the medial.  It can occasionally be injured or torn by twisting the knee or applying direct force, as seen in contact sports.

Structure
The lateral meniscus is grooved laterally for the tendon of the popliteus, which separates it from the fibular collateral ligament.

Its anterior end is attached in front of the intercondyloid eminence of the tibia, lateral to, and behind, the anterior cruciate ligament, with which it blends; the posterior end is attached behind the intercondyloid eminence of the tibia and in front of the posterior end of the medial meniscus.

The anterior attachment of the lateral meniscus is twisted on itself so that its free margin looks backward and upward, its anterior end resting on a sloping shelf of bone on the front of the lateral process of the intercondyloid eminence.

Close to its posterior attachment it sends off a strong fasciculus, the ligament of Wrisberg, which passes upward and medialward, to be inserted into the medial condyle of the femur, immediately behind the attachment of the posterior cruciate ligament.

The lateral meniscus gives off from its anterior convex margin a fasciculus which forms the transverse ligament.

Variation
Occasionally a small fasciculus passes forward to be inserted into the lateral part of the anterior cruciate ligament.

Clinical significance
The lateral meniscus is less likely to be injured or torn than the medial meniscus.  Diagnosis of lateral meniscus tear is done with McMurray's test.  If a tear is detected, treatment depends on the type and size of the tear.  Small tears can be treated conservatively, with rest, ice, and pain medications until the pain is under control, then exercise may be started with gradually increasing intensity, to improve range of motion and decrease swelling. More severe tears of the lateral meniscus require surgical repair or removal, which can often be done arthroscopically. Swelling and stiffness of the knee can occur when you have a torn lateral meniscus.

Additional images

See also

 Discoid meniscus
 Meniscal cartilage replacement therapy

References

External links
 
 
 

Joints
Lower limb anatomy